Nöykkiö (Finnish) or Nöykis (Swedish) is a district of Espoo, Finland. It was originally known only by its Swedish name Nöykis, but the Finnish name "Nöykkiö" came into use in the 1940s.

See also 
 Districts of Espoo

Districts of Espoo